South Africa played its first Test match in cricket in 1889 against England at Port Elizabeth, becoming the third Test nation after England and Australia.  This is a list of the men and women who have been the official South African captains in cricket.

South Africa was a founder member of the International Cricket Council in 1909.  However, the South African team did not play official Test cricket from 1970 to 1991, having been suspended from membership by the ICC as a result of controversy over apartheid (most particularly the reaction to the Basil d'Oliveira affair).  There were a number of rebel tours to South Africa in the intervening period, but none of the matches are recognised as official Test matches and are italicised below. South Africa rejoined the ICC, and resumed playing official Test cricket, in 1991.

Men's cricket

Test match captains
This is a list of cricketers who have captained the South African cricket team for at least one Test match. Where a player has a dagger (†) next to a Test match series in which he captained at least one Test, that denotes that player deputised for the appointed captain or were appointed by the home authority for a minor proportion in a series. The dagger classification follows that adopted by Wisden Cricketers' Almanack.

The table of results is complete up to the second Test against Australia in December 2022.

One Day International captains
This is a complete list of cricketers who have captained South Africa in at least one One Day International. Updated on 18 March 2023.

Twenty20 International captains

This is a list of cricketers who have captained South Africa for at least one Twenty20 International. 

Updated on 23 October 2021.

Women's cricket

Women's Test match captains

This is a list of cricketers who have captained the South African women's cricket team for at least one women's Test match.  Where a player has a dagger (†) next to a Test match series in which she captained at least one Test, that denotes that player was captain for a minor proportion in a series.

Women's One-Day International captains
This is a list of cricketers who have captained the South African women's cricket team for at least one women's one-day international. The table of results is complete up to the third WODI against India on 12 March 2021.

Women's Twenty20 Internationals
This is a list of cricketers who have captained the South African women's cricket team for at least one Women's Twenty20 International. It is complete up to the sixth T20I against India on 4 October 2019.

Youth cricket

Test match captains

This is a list of cricketers who have captained the South African U-19 cricket team for at least one under-19 Test match. The table of results is complete to the away second Test against England in August 2014. Where a player has a dagger (†) next to a Test match series in which he captained at least one Test, that denotes that player was captain for a minor proportion in a series.

Youth One-day International captains 

This is a list of cricketers who have captained the South African Under-19 cricket team for at least one Under-19 One Day International. The table of results is complete up to the conclusion of the 2016 Under-19 Cricket World Cup in February 2016.

See also
List of South African Test cricketers
List of South African ODI cricketers

References
Wisden Cricketers' Almanack
Cricinfo StatsGuru
CricketArchive

 
South Africa
National
Cricket captains